Dutton Ridge is a mountain in Schoharie County, New York. It is located southeast of Middleburgh. East Hill is located north-northwest and Scott Patent Hill is located south of Dutton Ridge.

References

Mountains of Schoharie County, New York
Mountains of New York (state)